Louis Heim (August 30, 1874 – April 21, 1954) was an American rower who competed in the 1904 Summer Olympics. In 1904 he was part of the Western Rowing Club, which won the bronze medal in the coxless four.

References

External links
 Sports-Reference profile

1874 births
1954 deaths
Rowers at the 1904 Summer Olympics
Olympic bronze medalists for the United States in rowing
American male rowers
Medalists at the 1904 Summer Olympics